The list of ship commissionings in 1895 includes a chronological list of all ships commissioned in 1895.


See also 

1895
 Ship commissionings